The 1999 Colorado Springs mayoral election took place on April 6, 1999, to elect the mayor of Colorado Springs, Colorado. The election was held concurrently with various other local elections. The election was officially nonpartisan.

Results

References

1999
1999 Colorado elections
1999 United States mayoral elections